Calliandra aeschynomenoides is a species of flowering plants of the genus Calliandra in the family Fabaceae. C. aeschynomenoides is an endemic species of Brazil, South America.

References

aeschynomenoides